The sixth season of the American television series Agents of S.H.I.E.L.D., based on the Marvel Comics organization S.H.I.E.L.D., follows S.H.I.E.L.D. agents and allies as they try to save humanity following the death of director Phil Coulson. It is set in the Marvel Cinematic Universe (MCU) and acknowledges the continuity of the franchise's films. The season is produced by ABC Studios, Marvel Television, and Mutant Enemy Productions, with Jed Whedon, Maurissa Tancharoen, and Jeffrey Bell serving as showrunners.

Clark Gregg, who portrays Coulson in the series and films, returns as a new character in the season, alongside series regulars Ming-Na Wen, Chloe Bennet, Iain De Caestecker, Elizabeth Henstridge, Henry Simmons, and Natalia Cordova-Buckley. They are joined by Jeff Ward, promoted from a recurring role in the fifth season. The sixth season was ordered in May 2018, and filming took place from that July until December. Unlike previous seasons, which featured direct tie-ins with MCU films, this season avoids referencing the films Avengers: Infinity War (2018) and Avengers: Endgame (2019) due to logistical issues, and so it can tell its own story.

The sixth season premiered on ABC on May 10, 2019, and ran for 13 episodes until August 2. The season debuted to lower ratings and had a lower average viewership than the previous season, but it was the highest ranking program in its timeslot for the 2019 summer period and the best performing series for ABC in the timeslot since 2016. It received positive reviews, with praise for its lighter tone and pacing, which critics credited to its shorter run of episodes in comparison to previous seasons. Critics also praised the performances and writing. In November 2018, before the season debuted, ABC renewed the series for a seventh and final season.

Episodes

Cast and characters

Main
 Clark Gregg as Sarge and Phil Coulson
 Ming-Na Wen as Melinda May
 Chloe Bennet as Daisy Johnson / Quake
 Iain De Caestecker as Leo Fitz
 Elizabeth Henstridge as Jemma Simmons
 Henry Simmons as Alphonso "Mack" Mackenzie
 Natalia Cordova-Buckley as Elena "Yo-Yo" Rodriguez
 Jeff Ward as Deke Shaw

Recurring
 Maximilian Osinski as Davis
 Briana Venskus as Piper
 Joel Stoffer as Enoch
 Barry Shabaka Henley as Marcus Benson
 Winston James Francis as Jaco
 Matt O'Leary as Pax
 Brooke Williams as Snowflake
 Christopher James Baker as Malachi
 Shainu Bala as Trevor Khan
 Karolina Wydra as Izel

Notable guests
 Maurissa Tancharoen as Sequoia
 Coy Stewart as Flint

Production

Development
In January 2018, ABC Entertainment president Channing Dungey was optimistic about Agents of S.H.I.E.L.D. receiving a renewal for a sixth season, but in March, Nellie Andreeva of Deadline Hollywood described the series as being "on the bubble", meaning it "could go either way". Despite receiving low live ratings in its fifth season, the series was considered a "strong DVR gainer and an even stronger international seller" as well as Marvel Television's only chance to have a series on ABC in the 2018–19 television season given that fellow series Inhumans was considered "dead", and ultimately canceled. The series' crew believed that it was likely to be cancelled, and they made the fifth-season finale as if it was the last episode of the series. On May 14, 2018, Agents of S.H.I.E.L.D. was renewed for a sixth season, consisting of 13 episodes. Some commentators, as well as the series' crew, assumed that this shorter season (previous seasons consisted of 22 episodes) would be the series' last, but Dungey denied this, and a seventh season was ordered in November 2018. The sixth-season premiere features an onscreen tribute to S.H.I.E.L.D. co-creator Stan Lee, who died in November 2018.

Writing
Because showrunners Jed Whedon, Maurissa Tancharoen, and Jeffrey Bell knew that a seventh season had been ordered while they were working on the sixth, they and the series' writers had the confidence to plan a story that is split over both seasons, with a cliffhanger ending for the sixth season that will be resolved in the seventh. The writers tried to create more episodes in the season that were "outside of [their] normal form of storytelling", like the third season episode "4,722 Hours", and noted that at this point they had gone beyond all of their initial plans for the series and had to work to create new storylines that did not repeat elements from previous seasons. For previous seasons, the writers divided their stories into different "pods" rather than stretching a single story over 22 episodes, but this was not necessary for the shorter 13-episode season.

The season begins one year after the end of the fifth season, in part because the writers wanted to give the characters time to mourn the death of Phil Coulson before starting their next adventure. This season finds the cast split into two groups: a team in space searching for Leo Fitz following the events of season five, and the rest of S.H.I.E.L.D. on Earth. The space sequences expand on elements that were introduced in the fifth season, including the alien Confederacy which Whedon described as a "nod to the tone" of the space elements in the Marvel Cinematic Universe (MCU) but also an attempt to find a new area of that world to explore for the series. Whedon added, "I think that fans are going to be excited to see the nooks and crannies of space that we explore." On Earth, the characters investigate a series of energy anomalies while rebuilding S.H.I.E.L.D. and carrying on Coulson's legacy, with Alphonso "Mack" Mackenzie taking over as director of the organization. They eventually come into contact with Sarge, a new threat to the world who looks like Coulson. Star Chloe Bennet revealed ahead of the season's premiere that there would be an element of fantasy that previous seasons did not have.

The season's storyline revolves around several monoliths, magical stones that were introduced in previous seasons. The writers had not intended this when they first introduced the objects, but when approaching the sixth season they wanted a way to have Sarge be created from Coulson and used the monoliths established control over space, time, and manifesting fear to do so. The writers felt that having Sarge join the heroes at the end of the season would result in a "watered-down" version of Coulson, and they did not want to repeat themselves by carrying the villain over to the next season, so they chose to kill the character off at the end of the season. The season also introduces the Chronicoms as a threat to Earth for the seventh season, with the majority of their story told in short "tag" scenes at the end of each episode leading up to the final episode's cliffhanger.

Casting
After the airing of the fifth season's finale, which implied the death of Coulson, actor Clark Gregg said there was "some interest" in having him be involved in the sixth season, and that he would be meeting with the showrunners to discuss this. He speculated that this involvement could be for flashbacks, and was unsure if he would remain a series regular as he had been for the previous five seasons. At San Diego Comic-Con 2018, main cast members Ming-Na Wen, Chloe Bennet, Iain De Caestecker, Elizabeth Henstridge, Henry Simmons, and Natalia Cordova-Buckley were confirmed to return from previous seasons as Melinda May, Daisy Johnson / Quake, Leo Fitz, Jemma Simmons, Alphonso "Mack" Mackenzie, and Elena "Yo-Yo" Rodriguez, respectively. Additionally, Jeff Ward was promoted to series regular for the season, after recurring in the fifth as Deke Shaw. That December, Coulson was confirmed to have died between the events of the fifth and sixth seasons. In the season's first teaser released the next month, Gregg was revealed to be portraying a new character in the season, named Sarge. Gregg was confirmed in March 2019 to be retaining his series regular status for the season.

Also returning from previous seasons are Briana Venskus as Piper and Maximilian Osinski as Davis, two minor S.H.I.E.L.D. agents that fans responded positively to in previous seasons. Tancharoen stated that they would be explored more in this season, with the executive producers all agreeing that they had grown to love the characters just as the fans had. This expanded role promoted Venskus and Osinski to recurring status, after having "off-and-on" roles in previous seasons. Additional returners include Joel Stoffer as Enoch and Coy Stewart as Flint. In April 2018, Karolina Wydra, Christopher James Baker, and Barry Shabaka Henley were announced as cast in the roles of mercenary Izel, assassin Malachi, and natural science professor Marcus Benson. Whedon hoped the new characters would bring some "new flavors" to the series. In May, with the season's premiere, several recurring actors were revealed to be portraying members of Sarge's team: Brooke Williams as Snowflake, Winston James Francis as Jaco, and Matt O'Leary as Pax. Shainu Bala also recurs in the season as agent Trevor Khan, while Tancharoen has a role as Deke's girlfriend Sequoia.

Design
Costume designer Whitney Galitz updated Bennet's Quake costume and hairstyle for the season. The updated costume pays homage to the character's appearance in the animated film Marvel Rising: Secret Warriors (where Bennet also voices the character), and retains her gauntlets and utility belt from previous seasons albeit "streamlined and slimmed down". The Quake symbol on the costume's back is also retained, and updated with "contrasting leather panels to make it pop". As part of the inspiration from Marvel Rising, the updated suit has "an additional punch of color to it ... [with] some purple embellishments near the neckline running down the front sides" along with below the waist, while Bennet has longer, blonde hair with purple highlights. Britt Lawrence of Cinema Blend felt Bennet's hair "works fantastically opposite Quake's new costume" with the hair "an extension of Quake's outfit... Instead of being a standalone look, her hair is contributing to it." Lawrence pointed out that the animated version had more purple accents in the costume and a darker, shorter hairstyle where the purple highlights "[frame] her face", compared to the use of purple in Bennet's hair which was more like "softer highlights".

Filming
Filming for the season began on July 16, 2018, in Culver City, California, with Gregg directing the first episode of the season. After the emotional fifth-season finale, Wen felt that returning for the sixth season with Gregg directing was "wonderful out of the gate, and like we got a new life". She added that the shorter season length was a relief due to the series being "mentally, emotionally, and physically" taxing to film, allowing the cast to work at "150, 200 percent" for the whole season instead of "feeling like, by the 16th episode, we are just trying to swim up river". Filming wrapped by December 18, 2018.

Music
Composer Bear McCreary created a "rollickin' blues theme" for Sarge in the season, and composed the musical theme Izel sung "during her creepy transformations".

Marvel Cinematic Universe tie-ins
When asked how the season would connect to the then-upcoming MCU film Avengers: Endgame, Marvel Television head Jeph Loeb suggested in March 2019 that the one year time jump between the previous season of the series and this one was part of the series' tie-in to that film. Endgame is a direct sequel to Avengers: Infinity War (2018), which saw the death of half of all life in the universe beginning shortly after the events of Agents of S.H.I.E.L.D. season five. Endgame features a five-year time-jump before reversing these deaths, setting the sixth season of S.H.I.E.L.D. during a time that half of all life is still dead. After Endgame was released in April, the showrunners and Loeb revealed that the series would not be depicting this loss of life for several reasons: they began production on the season without knowing all of Endgames plot or how Spider-Man: Far From Home (2019) would be depicting a post-Endgame MCU; they were unsure when the season would be released in relation to Endgame and how much they would be allowed to reveal if they had begun airing before the film was released; and they wanted to focus on telling their own story rather than be "shackled too much to the universe-changing events from the films". They acknowledged that this meant the series no longer lined-up with the films' timeline, but Whedon said the writers had an explanation for this that made sense to them even though they did not plan to "burden the audience" with it. Tim Baysinger of TheWrap suggested that the time travel plot of the fifth season could explain the discrepancy by moving the sixth season into an alternate future not seen by Doctor Strange during Infinity War, one in which the deaths never happened. The season has some thematic similarities with Endgame, as both depict their heroes dealing with loss, which Whedon said was "not a coincidence" and described as "the nature of these stories".

Marketing
A teaser for the season was released in January 2019, revealing Gregg's role. In March, Marvel released a promotional image for the season recreating Leonardo da Vinci's painting The Last Supper with the season's main cast members. Marketing producer Geoffrey Colo clarified that it was not an image from any of the season's episodes, but a "thematic representation" of the season filled with Easter eggs for upcoming episodes on which Colo said, "Some you'll recognize, others won't hold any significance until you've seen the particular episode." The image led to speculation from commentators as to which of the Twelve Apostles from the original painting were being represented by each of the series' characters, and whether any character would represent the betrayer Judas Iscariot. The premiere episode was first screened at WonderCon on March 30. On July 18, 2019, the series had a panel at San Diego Comic-Con with the main cast and executive producers. A sneak peek for the end of the season was also shown.

Release

Broadcast
The sixth season began airing on ABC in the United States on May 10, 2019, and consisted of 13 episodes. On holding the season until mid-2019, Dungey explained, "By putting it on the summer we feel we can super-serve the show’s audience and possibly have it on the air longer," in part because ABC's "live-same-day ratings are less important" in the summer season. Since the season was set to air after the release of Avengers: Endgame, Dungey noted in May 2018 that the decision to schedule it then was ABC's, and not in accordance with any of Marvel Studios' larger MCU plans. However, at one point between then and the season's release, ABC asked Marvel Television about moving the season's premiere several months earlier, and the studio asked them not to do this so that Endgame would not be released in the middle of the season's airing.

Home media
The season began streaming on Netflix in the United States on September 1, 2019, and was available until February 28, 2022. It became available on Disney+ in the United States on March 16, 2022, joining other territories where it was already available on the service.

Reception

Ratings

According to Nielsen Media Research, the season premiered to a 0.4/3 percent share among adults between the ages of 18 and 49, meaning that it was seen by 0.4 percent of all households, and 3 percent of all of those watching television at the time of the broadcast. This was a drop from the previous seasons's finale and average viewership. However, the total audience of 2.31 million people was the largest for the series since January 2018. The season went on to be the highest ranking program in its timeslot for the 2019 summer period, and best performing series for ABC in the timeslot since the 2016 summer period. The season averaged 2.25 million total viewers, including from DVR, ranking 158th among network series in the 2018–19 television season. It also had an average total 18-49 rating of 0.4, which was 165th.

Critical response
The review aggregator website Rotten Tomatoes reports a 93% approval rating, with an average score of 7.7/10, based on 15 reviews. The website's consensus reads, "Six seasons in and Agents of S.H.I.E.L.D. continues to deepen its exploration of space and the relationships between its heroes."

References

General references

External links
 

 
2019 American television seasons
Television series set in 1931
Television series set in 2018
Television series set in 2019